There are two species of snake named variable marsh snake:
 Natriciteres variegata, species of natricine snake found across Africa
 Natriciteres pembana, species of natricine snake found on Pemba Island in Tanzania